SM UB-7 was a German Type UB I submarine or U-boat in the German Imperial Navy during World War I. She disappeared in the Black Sea in September 1916.

UB-7 was ordered in October 1914 and was laid down at the AG Weser shipyard in Bremen in November. She carried two torpedoes for her two bow torpedo tubes and was also armed with a deck-mounted machine gun. UB-7 was originally one of a pair of UB I boats sent to the Austro-Hungarian Navy to replace an Austrian pair to be sent to the Dardanelles, and was broken into sections and shipped by rail to Pola in March 1915 for reassembly. She was launched in April and commissioned as SM UB-7 in the German Imperial Navy in May when the Austrians opted out of the agreement.

Although briefly a part of the Pola Flotilla at commissioning, UB-7 spent the majority of her career patrolling the Black Sea as part of the Constantinople Flotilla. In October, she helped repel a Russian bombardment of Bulgaria. She was considered for transfer to the Bulgarian Navy, but disappeared in late September 1916 before a transfer could take place. Her fate is officially unknown, but sources report that may have struck a mine or been sunk by a Russian airplane.

Design and construction 
After the German Army's rapid advance along the North Sea coast in the earliest stages of World War I, the German Imperial Navy found itself without suitable submarines that could be operated in the narrow and shallow seas off Flanders. Project 34, a design effort begun in mid-August 1914, produced the Type UB I design: a small submarine that could be shipped by rail to a port of operations and quickly assembled. UB-7 was part of the initial allotment of eight submarines—numbered  to —ordered on 15 October from Germaniawerft of Kiel, just shy of two months after planning for the class began.

UB-7 was laid down by Germaniawerft in Kiel on 30 November. She had a single  Daimler 4-cylinder diesel engine for surface travel, and a single  Siemens-Schuckert electric motor for underwater travel, both attached to a single propeller shaft.

UB-7 was armed with two  torpedoes in two bow torpedo tubes. She was also outfitted for a single  machine gun on deck. UB-7s standard complement consisted of one officer and thirteen enlisted men.

While UB-7s construction neared completion in early March 1915, Enver Pasha and other Turkish leaders were pleading with their German and Austro-Hungarian allies to send submarines to the Dardanelles to help attack the British and French fleet pounding Turkish positions. The Germans induced the Austro-Hungarian Navy ( or ) to send two boats—its own Germaniawerft-built boats  and —with the promise of UB-7 and UB-8 as replacements.

When work on UB-7 and UB-8 was complete at the Germaniwerft yard, they were both readied for rail shipment. The process of shipping a UB I boat involved breaking the submarine down into what was essentially a knock down kit. Each boat was broken into approximately fifteen pieces and loaded onto eight railway flatcars. The boats were ready for shipment to the main Austrian naval base at Pola on 15 March, despite the fact that the Austrian pair was still not ready. German engineers and technicians that accompanied the German boats to Pola worked under the supervision of Kapitänleutnant Hans Adam, head of the newly created U-boat special command. Typically, the UB I assembly process took about two to three weeks, and, accordingly, UB-7 was launched at Pola sometime in April.

Career 
During her trials, UB-7 developed a leak which took some time to repair. In the meantime, she was assigned the Austrian number of U-7 and an Austrian commander. Her German crew at Pola—since it was still the intent for UB-7 to be transferred to the K.u.K. Kriegsmarine—wore either civilian clothes or Austrian uniforms. As time dragged on, the Austrian U-3 and U-4 were still not ready, and eventually Admiral Anton Haus, the head of the Austrian Navy, reneged on his commitment because of the overt hostility from neighbor and former ally Italy.

With the change of heart from the Austrians, Germany resolved to retain UB-7 and send her to the aid of the Turks. So, upon completion of her leak repairs, the boat was commissioned into the German Imperial Navy as SM UB-7 on 6 May under the command of Oberleutnant zur See Wilhelm Werner, a 26-year-old native of Apolda. At commissioning, the boat temporarily joined the Pola Flotilla.

Because of her limited range, UB-7 would not have been able to make the entire journey to Turkey, so on the night on 15/16 May, she was towed by the Austrian destroyer  through the Straits of Otranto and into the Ionian Sea. By June, UB-7 had reached Smyrna—not having any success on her journey there—and joined  and UB-8 in the Constantinople Flotilla. Once there, UB-7 was ineffective because she was hampered by her limited torpedo supply and her weak engines, which made negotiating the strong Dardanelles currents nearly impossible. Because of this, UB-7 was sent to patrol in the Black Sea in July, cruising without success from the 5th to the 22nd.

In September 1915, UB-7 and UB-8 were sent to Varna, Bulgaria, and from there, to patrol off the Russian Black Sea coast.

Because Bulgaria had joined the Central Powers, battleships of the Russian Black Sea Fleet, and aircraft from the seaplane carriers  and  began attacks on Varna and the Bulgarian coast on 25 October. UB-7 and UB-8, both based out of Varna by this time, sortied to disrupt the bombardment. Although UB-7s crew heard what they thought was the torpedo explode, it did not hit Panteleimon. Despite the lack of success, the attempt did cause the Russians to break off their attacks and withdraw.

In early 1916, UB-7 and UB-8 were still cruising in the Black Sea out of Varna. The Germans did not have good luck in the Black Sea, which was not a priority for them. The Bulgarians, who saw the value of the submarines in repelling Russian attacks, began negotiations to purchase UB-7 and UB-8. Bulgarian sailors practiced in the pair of boats and technicians were sent to Kiel for training at the German submarine school there. The transfer of UB-8 to the Bulgarian Navy took place on 25 May 1916, but for reasons unreported in sources, UB-7 remained under the German flag.

In July 1916, the Germans sent  to mine off Novorossisk. To attempt to neutralize any Russian response, UB-7—under the command of Hans Lütjohann, who had taken over for Werner when he returned to Germany to command the new —was stationed off Sevastopol to attack any ships that sailed in response to the mission. Unfortunately, Russian seaplanes spotted UB-7 and bombed the U-boat, preventing her from accomplishing her goal. With the submarine out of the way, Rear Admiral Aleksandr Kolchak sortied with dreadnought , cruiser , and five destroyers. The Russian fleet engaged Breslau, which was forced to abort her mission and retire. Sources are quiet on damage, if any, suffered by UB-7.

Summary of raiding history

Fate 
On 27 September 1916, UB-7 departed Varna for operations off Sevastopol and was never heard from again. According to some sources, UB-7 was mined somewhere in the Black Sea. In June 1917, a Russian pilot captured by the Germans reported that a Russian airplane bombed and sank UB-7 on 1 October at position , near the Chersones Lighthouse. Authors Dwight Messimer and Robert Grant are each dubious of this claim, and the fate of UB-7 is still officially unknown. Among the fifteen men lost on UB-7 were the Constantinople Flotilla's senior radio officer, and the first Bulgarian submariner lost during the war, a trainee from Vidin.

References

Notes

Citations

Bibliography 

 

 
 
 
 
 
 
 
 
 
 
 
 
 

German Type UB I submarines
Ships built in Kiel
Ships built in Pola
1915 ships
U-boats commissioned in 1915
World War I submarines of Germany
Maritime incidents in 1916
U-boats sunk in 1916
World War I shipwrecks in the Black Sea